Colby High School may refer to:

 Colby High School (Kansas) in Colby, Kansas
 Colby High School (Wisconsin) in Colby, Wisconsin

See also
 Colby (disambiguation)